Tebutop is a mountain in Suriname at . It is located in the Sipaliwini District.

The mountain was explored during both the 1904 Tapanahony expedition and the 1907 Tumuk Humak expedition. The mountain is sacred for the Ndyuka and Amerindians that live in the area.

Notes

References

External links

Inselbergs of South America
Mountains of Suriname
Sipaliwini District